Marvin Brunswijk (born 24 October 1976 in Rotterdam, Netherlands) is a retired  Dutch footballer.

Club career
He made his Eerste Divisie league debut during the 1996–1997 season with club SBV Excelsior. Brunswijk also played for clubs RBC Roosendaal during the 1999–2002 seasons and Stormvogels Telstar.

In July 2003 he left Cypriot side Anorthosis for Dutch amateur side Delta Sport.

References

External links
voetbal international profile
sports reference retrieved 7 June 2012

1976 births
Living people
Footballers from Rotterdam
Association football defenders
Dutch footballers
Excelsior Rotterdam players
RBC Roosendaal players
SC Telstar players
Anorthosis Famagusta F.C. players
Eredivisie players
Eerste Divisie players
Cypriot First Division players
Dutch expatriate footballers
Expatriate footballers in Cyprus
Dutch expatriate sportspeople in Cyprus